English, August is a 1994 Indian English-language film and director Dev Benegal's first feature film. A humorous and irreverent study of bureaucracy and the Indian Generation X, English, August won several awards at international film festivals.

English, August became the first Indian independent film to break the stranglehold of mainstream Indian Bollywood cinema when it was acquired by 20th Century Fox and became a theatrical success in the country. This has led the way for other low budget, independent movies such as Bombay Boys and Split Wide Open, which are part of the next generation of "middle cinema".

The film is based on the novel of the same name by Upamanyu Chatterjee.

The negatives of the film were spoiled due to flooding at a storage facility of Prasad Studios. There was an unsuccessful attempt at restoration, following which the film was declared a lost film.

In February 2020, a copy of the film was found in the National Film Archives of India. Since the film reel is a 35 mm print, the restoration process has begun. However, restoration was brought to a halt in March 2020 due to the COVID-19 pandemic.

Plot summary
Agastya Sen (Rahul Bose), nicknamed "English, August", speaks and thinks in English. A lover of poetry, he listens to Bob Dylan, Miles Davis, rock and jazz and reads Marcus Aurelius. He is also an Indian Administrative Service Officer, a member of the most influential and powerful cadre of civil servants in India. He is sent off for a year's training to Madna, the hottest town in the country. Culture shock and a language barrier in his own country follows (August's mother tongue is Bengali). He feels like a foreigner, but must survive.

Moreover, August is surrounded by wild characters: Srivastava, the pompous head bureaucrat and his wife Malti, the fashion and cultural leader of the town; Sathe, a local pothead and cartoonist; Kumar, the Police Superintendent and connoisseur of porn films; and Vasant, the world's worst cook. August negotiates this provincial creek with the only paddle he can find; Fantasy, daydreams and "self-abuse" become his means of revolt and escape as he escapes from the heat into the mystery and quiet of his secret world of erotic fantasy and contemplation.

Cast and characters
 Rahul Bose as Agastya "August" Sen
 Salim Shah as Ravi Srivastava
 Tanvi Azmi as Malti Srivastava
 Shivaji Satham as Govind Sathe
 Virendra Saxena as Laxman Shankar
 Mita Vashisht as Sita Avery

Awards and recognition
 Won the Silver Montgolfiere and the Gilberto Martinez Solares prize for the Best First Film at the 1994 Festival des 3 continents
 Won the Best Feature Film in English at the 1995 National Film Awards, India
 Won a Special Jury Prize at the 1994 Torino International Festival of Young Cinema

Soundtrack
The original soundtrack for the film is composed by D. Wood and consists of the following instrumental tracks.

 "August Blues" 
 "By the Sea"
 "Title Theme"
 "Welcome to Madna"
 "End Titles"

Notes

External links
Dev Benegal Weblog

New York Times review

1994 films
English-language Indian films
Indian comedy films
Indian satirical films
Films based on Indian novels
Lost Indian films
Best English Feature Film National Film Award winners
1994 directorial debut films
1994 comedy films
1990s satirical films
Rediscovered Indian films
1990s English-language films